Corrado Pavolini (8 January 1898 – 10 April 1980) was an Italian writer identified with the futurist movement. He was the brother of the Fascist politician Alessandro Pavolini. Corrado served as the literary editor of the Rome-based Fascist daily newspaper Il Tevere.

Selected filmography
 The Iron Crown (1941)
 A Pistol Shot (1942)
 Men of the Mountain (1943)
 Flying Squadron (1949)
 The Crossroads (1951)
 The Mistress of Treves (1952)

References

Bibliography 
 Liehm, Mira. Passion and Defiance: Film in Italy from 1942 to the Present. University of California Press, 1984.

External links 
 

1898 births
1980 deaths
Journalists from Florence
Italian male journalists
20th-century Italian screenwriters
Italian male screenwriters
Writers from Florence
20th-century Italian journalists
20th-century Italian male writers